Goganpani may refer to several places in Nepal:

 Goganpani, Bagmati
Goganpani, Bheri